KNAB-FM (104.1 FM, The Peoples Choice) is a radio station broadcasting a country music format. Licensed to Burlington, Colorado, U.S., the station is currently owned by Knab and features programming from Citadel Broadcasting and Westwood One.

References

External links

NAB-FM